Puzhu (Malayalam: പുഴു) is a 2022 Indian Malayalam-language psychological drama film directed by debutant Ratheena and jointly written by Harshad and Suhas-Sharfu. The film stars Mammootty in the lead role. Cinematography of the film is handled by Theni Eswar and the film score and songs are composed by Jakes Bejoy. Mammootty played a negative shaded role in the film.

Principal photography began on 17 August 2021 at Ernakulam, Kerala. The film was scheduled to release in theatres in the first half of 2022. Later, it was announced that the film would be skipping a theatrical release and decided for a direct-to-streaming release on SonyLIV. It was premiered on SonyLIV on 12 May 2022 in Malayalam, Hindi, Kannada, Tamil and Telugu languages. The film received positive reviews from critics, with special praise for Mammootty's performance.

Plot
Kuttan is a high ranking IPS officer and a widower who belongs to a Brahmin community and stays in a luxury apartment along with his son, Kichu. His overprotective nature and authoritative methods suffocate Kichu, who wishes his father to die. Kuttan starts to feel that someone is trying to kill him and is suspicious of everyone. His paranoia is accentuated when his younger sister, Bharati, comes to stay in a nearby flat along with her theatre artist husband, Kuttappan. Kuttan shares a problematic relationship with Bharati, as she had eloped with Kuttappan, who is from an oppressed caste. Kuttan's hatred and bigotry results in him unleashing his rage and losing his sanity.

Cast

Production

Development
On 8 March 2021 (Women's Day), makers announced the film through social media by sharing the title poster.

Puzhu is a debut direction of Ratheena who has previously worked as the executive producer of Parvathy-starrer Uyare, aside from associating with filmmakers such as Revathi. The film was to be produced by S. George under the banner Cyn-Cyl Celluloid and distributed by 
Dulquer Salmaan's home banner Wayfarer Films. Deepu Joseph was announced as the editor while Manu Jagadh was in charge of the art department. Vishnu Govind and Sree Shankar of Sound Factor were to be working on the sound design. Veteran production controller Badusha was roped in with Renish Abdulkhader, Rajesh Krishna, and Shyam Mohan as executive producers.

Filming
Principal photography began on 17 August 2021 with a switch-on ceremony held at Ernakulam, Kerala. Mammootty joined the sets of the film on 10 September 2021. A first look poster of the film was released on 18 September 2021. On 15 October 2021, Mammootty informed the completion of shoot by sharing a group photo with the crew members through his social media account.

Release 
Puzhu was scheduled to release in theatres in the first half of 2022. Later, It was announced that the film would be skipping the theatrical release and option for a direct-to-digital release.

Puzhu had its world premiere on SonyLIV on 12 May 2022 in 5 languages (Malayalam, Hindi, Kannada, Tamil and Telugu).

Reception 
In a review rating it 4 out of 5 stars, Anna M. M. Vetticad of Firstpost wrote, “Puzhu’s flaws cannot be taken lightly, yet the film is stunning for so many reasons, making Ratheena one of the most significant voices to emerge from Indian cinema in recent years." Manoj Kumar R of The Indian Express rated it 4 out of 5 stars and wrote that the film "Puzhu distinguishes itself from other movies that examine the dehumanising effects of the caste system by being completely non-judgemental. Mammootty is a revelation. If not for the camera’s power to capture the minute details of faces, the hatred that Mammootty showcases with the little twitch of his eyes and lips would have escaped our naked eyes. Mammootty delivers a moving performance as a man with a questionable and even condemnable worldview". The Hindu'''s S. R. Praveen reviewed that "Mammootty’s menacing presence anchors this important debut film with few failings" and added "It is always a joy to see superstars breaking out of the tiresome mould that they have been caught in for years, and rediscovering their sparkling abilities which endeared them to the audience in the first place". The News Minute in its review said, "Ratheena, the director, could not have made a better debut", adding that "Another plot device that seems to distract you from the otherwise captivating script is the overuse of theatre. Drama trying to be too dramatic, years after theatre found new pathways. But Puzhu is still going to disturb you, a lot, as it is supposed to. Vishnu Muraleedharan of Malayala Manorama wrote "It seems like Mammootty has found his calling in scripts that have its base in Mahabharata and we are not complaining. The veteran actor has performed like a dream in Puzhu." Calling the film a "disturbing mystery thriller", Kerala Kaumudi wrote that "despite its flaws, Puzhu definitely marks an exceptional directorial debut."

Anna M. M. Vetticad ranked it seventh on her year-end list of best Malayalam films on Firstpost''.

References

External links 
 

2022 films
2020s Malayalam-language films
2022 drama films
Indian psychological drama films
2022 directorial debut films
Indian direct-to-video films
2022 direct-to-video films
SonyLIV original films
Films about parenting
Films about the caste system in India
Films shot in Kochi
Films about social issues in India
Indian films about revenge
Films about single parent families
Films about dysfunctional families
Films about honor killing
Films scored by Jakes Bejoy